Nélson Luís Kerchner (born 31 December 1962 in São Paulo, Brazil), nicknamed Nelsinho, is a retired Brazilian footballer who played as a defender. He played for the Brazil national team at the 1987 Copa América in Argentina.

Career statistics

Club

International

References

External links

 

1962 births
Living people
Brazilian footballers
Brazilian expatriate footballers
Campeonato Brasileiro Série A players
J1 League players
Japan Football League (1992–1998) players
Expatriate footballers in Japan
Brazil under-20 international footballers
Brazil international footballers
1987 Copa América players
Brazilian people of German descent
Pan American Games gold medalists for Brazil
Association football defenders
Pan American Games medalists in football
São Paulo FC players
Sport Club Corinthians Paulista players
CR Flamengo footballers
Kashiwa Reysol players
Associação Atlética Internacional (Limeira) managers
Footballers at the 1987 Pan American Games
Brazilian football managers
Medalists at the 1987 Pan American Games
Footballers from São Paulo